The Simpson E. Jones House, located in Bend, Oregon, is a house listed on the National Register of Historic Places.

See also
 National Register of Historic Places listings in Deschutes County, Oregon

References

Houses on the National Register of Historic Places in Bend, Oregon
1924 establishments in Oregon
Houses completed in 1924
Bungalow architecture in Oregon